Seena Donneson (May 1924 - April 16, 2020) (also known as Seena Donneson Gershwin) was an American sculptor and printmaker. She studied at the Pratt Institute and at the Art Students League of New York.

Collections
Donneson's work is held in the permanent collections of the Smithsonian American Art Museum, the Museum of Modern Art, New York, the Brooklyn Museum, the Portland Art Museum and the Amon Carter Museum of American Art.

References

1924 births
2020 deaths
20th-century American women artists
20th-century American sculptors
20th-century American printmakers
21st-century American women artists
21st-century American sculptors
21st-century American printmakers
American women sculptors
Artists from New York City
Art Students League of New York alumni
Pratt Institute alumni